"No More Drama" is a song by American recording artist Mary J. Blige, taken from her fifth studio album of the same name (2001). It was released as the album's second single in the United States on October 30, 2001, and as the third single in some European markets, where "Dance for Me" served as the second single instead. The Jimmy Jam and Terry Lewis-produced track became another hit for Blige, peaking at number 15 on the US Billboard Hot 100 and number nine in the United Kingdom.

The song famously samples "Nadia's Theme", currently used as the theme music for the American soap opera The Young and the Restless. In the song, Blige calls herself "young and restless" in a further nod to the music sample. The video for the song won Blige her first MTV Video Music Award for Best R&B Video. The song was also used as a background theme for both Tyler Perry's Why Did I Get Married? and Why Did I Get Married Too?. Perry Botkin Jr., one of the song's original composers, who had never heard of Blige prior to this was delighted to get a writing credit, saying: "I woke up one morning and I'm on the cutting edge of R&B. These days, I'm completely removed from pop music — except when [royalty] checks arrive." It was performed by Blige in the Super Bowl LVI halftime show on February 13, 2022.

Music video
The video features cameos by Mariah Carey and P. Diddy who had both recently experienced their own very publicized 'dramas', Mariah Carey's personal and professional problems following her movie and album Glitter, and Diddy's legal troubles following a night club shooting. They appear individually on televisions stacked in a store front window, in front of which Blige is singing. The video contains images of a depressed man that is struggling to overcome drugs (played by actor David Venafro), a gang member who lost a friend in a shooting and a woman who is verbally and physically abused by her partner. While the theme of the video is dramatic, it ends on an encouraging note as the gang member decides to end the cycle of killing by leaving his gang; the drug addict is seen to be headed for a rehab clinic to combat his addiction and the woman finding the strength to leave her abusive lover behind and start a new life. It was directed by Sanji.

Cover versions
Joshua Ledet performed this song during the eleventh season of American Idol. James Arthur also performed this song, during the ninth series of The X Factor. He would later win the series. The line "so tired, tired of all the drama" was briefly sampled in the 2013 Azealia Banks single "Yung Rapunxel". La'Porsha Renae, runner-up of American Idol (season 15), performed this song during the show's last season and it gained a lot of praise from the public and brought judge Jennifer Lopez to tears, moved by La'Porsha's story of an abusive relationship, which inspired her performance. Wé McDonald covered the song on The Voice season 11 in the Knockout Round. Sam Lavery sang the song in the sing-off of The X Factor 2016 in week 6 before being sent home.

Track listings
All versions of the P. Diddy/Mario Winans remix feature P. Diddy.

US 12-inch single
A1. "No More Drama" (P. Diddy/Mario Winans remix LP version) – 4:09
A2. "No More Drama" (P. Diddy/Mario Winans remix instrumental) – 4:09
A3. "No More Drama" (P. Diddy/Mario Winans remix a cappella) – 4:10
B1. "No More Drama" (Thunderpuss Club Anthem mix) – 9:18
B2. "No More Drama" (Drums of Thunderpuss) – 4:57

UK CD1
 "No More Drama" (radio edit) – 4:08
 "No More Drama" (P. Diddy/Mario Winans remix LP version) – 4:08
 "No More Drama" (The Twin Disco Experience remix) – 7:30
 "No More Drama" (video)

UK CD2
 "No More Drama" (radio edit) – 4:08
 "Mary Jane (All Night Long)" – 4:41
 "Everything" (album version) – 4:59

UK 12-inch single
A1. "No More Drama" (remix LP version)
A2. "No More Drama" (remix instrumental)
B1. "No More Drama" (The Twin Disco Experience remix)
B2. "No More Drama" (remix a cappella)

UK cassette single
 "No More Drama" (radio edit) – 4:08
 "No More Drama" (P. Diddy/Mario Winans remix LP version) – 4:08

European CD single
 "No More Drama" (radio edit) – 4:08
 "No More Drama" (Twin Disco Experience remix) – 7:30

Australasian CD single
 "No More Drama" (radio edit) – 4:08
 "No More Drama" (Twin Disco Experience remix edit) – 4:09
 "No More Drama" (Thunderpuss Club Anthem mix) – 9:17
 "No More Drama" (video)

Charts

Weekly charts

Year-end charts

Certifications

Release history

See also
 List of number-one dance singles of 2002 (U.S.)

References

Mary J. Blige songs
2001 singles
2001 songs
MCA Records singles
Music videos directed by Sanji (director)
Song recordings produced by Jimmy Jam and Terry Lewis
Songs written by Barry De Vorzon
Songs written by Jimmy Jam and Terry Lewis
Songs written by Perry Botkin Jr.